A production quota is a goal for the production of a good. It is typically set by a government or an organization, and can be applied to an individual worker, firm, industry or country. Quotas can be set high to encourage production, or can be used to restrict production to support a certain price level.

What is a quota?
A quota refers to a measure that limits, either minimum or maximum, on a particular activity. Quotas are usually enacted by governments or organizations to protect domestic industries. In short, it limits the number of goods a country can export or import during a certain period of time.

Criticism
Quotas, like other trade restrictions, are typically used to benefit the producers of a good at the expense of consumers in that economy. Possible effects include corruption (bribes to increase a quota allocation) or smuggling (concealed actions to exceed a quota).

Quotas disrupt normal business cycles and do not help innovation. While it may seem like a good idea for producers to enact a production quota, it has long-term negative consequences. Customers will often try to find alternative solutions. In the case of oil, people will either purchase different natural energy sources or work towards finding renewable energy sources.
Quotas also create deadweight loss. When a production quota has been added, there is a loss in consumer surplus and creation of deadweight loss. This triangle is also known as the ‘Harberger Triangle’.

Examples

Crude oil 
Oil production by OPEC
The Organization of the Petroleum Exporting Countries (OPEC) is a key example of an organization that uses production quotas. The 14 member states set a production quota for crude oil. This "maintains" the cost of crude oil per barrel in world markets.

Agricultural produce 
Common Agricultural Policy by the European Union
Agricultural Policy of the United States during the Great Depression
During the Great Depression, many production quotas were implemented. The purpose was to restrict the levels of production below competitive levels, which would increase the producer's income. This was important when the price of agricultural products in the global markets had taken a dramatic decline.

Other 
A 10-percent increase in production quotas for construction workers triggered the Uprising of 1953 in East Germany.

See also
Import quota
Individual fishing quota
Planned economy

References

External links
The Stalin Model for the Control and Coordination of Enterprises in a Socialist Economy 

Price controls
Quotas